Geoffrey James Coleman (born 13 May 1936) was an English professional football right back who appeared in the Football League for Northampton Town.

References 

1936 births
Living people
People from Bedworth
English footballers
Association football fullbacks
English Football League players
Bedworth United F.C. players
Northampton Town F.C. players